Carl Ludwig Patsch, also Karl Ludwig Patsch, ;  (14 September 1865 in Kovač – 21 February 1945 in Vienna) was an Austrian Slavist, Albanologist, archaeologist and historian.

Biography 
Carl Patsch was born in north-east Bohemia, as a son of Ludwig Patsch, a steward of an upper prince, but grew up in the Ukrainian villages of Marachivka and Slavuta. He spoke Czech, Polish and Russian as mother languages. 

Carl Patsch studied History, Geography and Classical Philology at the University of Prague, where he finished his doctorate in 1889. He taught in Vienna and Sarajevo and worked in the latter city for the Bosnian–Herzegovinian Museum. In 1908, Patsch founded the Institute for Balkan Research (Institut für Balkanforschung) in Sarajevo, where he remained until the end of World War I. In 1921, he became professor of Slavic history at the University of Vienna and was subsequently a member of the Austrian Academy of Sciences. Patsch is known for its articles on ancient Illyrian and Thracian history and culture.   In the years 1922 - 1924 Carl Patsch stayed and worked in Albania where he helped in the efforts to establish a national museum.

Works 
 Die Lika in römischer Zeit, Schriften der Balkankommission, Antiquarische Abteilung, 1. Wien 1900
 Das Sandschak Berat in Albanien, Schriften der Balkankommission, Antiquarische Abteilung, 3. Wien 1904
 Zur Geschichte und Topographie von Narona, Schriften der Balkankommission, Antiquarische Abteilung, 5 (1907)
 Archäologisch-epigraphische Untersuchungen zur Geschichte der römischen Provinz Dalmatien, Wiss. Mitt. aus Bosnien und d. Hercegovina, 8 Folgen in 4–12 (1896–1912)
 Beiträge zur Völkerkunde von Südosteuropa, 6 Bände, 1925–1937
 Historische Wanderungen im Karst und an der Adria. I. Teil: Die Herzegowina einst und jetzt, 1922
 Die einstige Siedlungsdichte des illyrischen Karstes, 1933
 Der Kampf um den Donauraum unter Domitian und Trajan, Hölder-Pichler-Tempsky, Wien 1937

See also 
 Albanology
 Slavic studies

Bibliography 
 Alois Hajek: Carl Patsch (1865–1945). In: Südost-Forschungen. Band 12 (1953), S. 263–269.
 
 Gerhard Seewann: Patsch, Carl. In: Mathias Bernath, Felix von Schroeder (Hrsg.): Biographisches Lexikon zur Geschichte Südosteuropas. Band 3. Oldenbourg, München 1979, ISBN 3-486-48991-7, S. 405 f.
 
 Radoslav Dodig, In Memoriam. Carl Patsch (1865-1945), Status. Magazine for political culture and society issues 2006/8, s.152-155.

References

External links 

 
 

1865 births
1945 deaths
19th-century Austrian historians
20th-century Austrian historians
19th-century linguists
20th-century linguists
19th-century archaeologists
20th-century archaeologists
Slavists
Albanologists
Austrian archaeologists
German Bohemian people
Austrian expatriates in Bulgaria
Foreign Members of the Bulgarian Academy of Sciences
People from Jičín District